Guide to Better Living is the debut studio album by Australian rock band Grinspoon. It was released on 16 September 1997 on the Grudge Records label (an imprint of Universal Music Australia) and was produced by Phil McKellar. The album reached number 11 on the ARIA Albums Chart and spent 36 weeks on the national charts. The album peaked at number 8 when rereleased in 2017.

At the 1998 ARIA Music Awards, Grinspoon received a nomination in the category 'Breakthrough Artist – Album' for Guide to Better Living. The album achieved a platinum certification from ARIA. It generated five singles, "Pedestrian", "DC×3", "Repeat", "Just Ace" and "Don't Go Away"; with "Just Ace" and "DC×3" both reaching the top 50 on the ARIA Singles Chart. On 9 March 1999 a trimmed and reordered version of the album was issued for the North American market.

Background
Guide to Better Living is the debut studio album by Australian alternative metal and post-grunge band Grinspoon. In 1995 the group formed in Lismore, New South Wales and are fronted by Phil Jamieson on vocals and guitar with Pat Davern on guitar, Joe Hansen on bass guitar and Kristian Hopes on drums. The group's second extended play, Licker Bottle Cozy, was recorded in June 1996 with Phil McKellar as producer.

In February 1997 the band recorded their debut album, with McKellar again, at Rockinghorse Studios in Byron Bay and mixed at Studios 301 in Sydney in April. The band considered the title, Sell Your Parents, but eventually decided on Guide to Better Living, after a 1960s catalogue of Sunbeam white goods. It had a slightly heavier sound than their earlier work. On 16 September 1997 they released the work on Grudge Records – an imprint of Universal Music Australia. It peaked at number 11 on the ARIA Albums Charts and by year's end it was certified platinum with shipment of over 70,000 units in Australia. At the ARIA Music Awards of 1998, Grinspoon received a nomination in the category 'Breakthrough Artist – Album' for Guide to Better Living. It represents the sound and variety of their early career with heavier songs like "Pressure Tested 1984" open the album, whilst in the middle are more classic rock songs like "Repeat" and "Don't Go Away" and then towards the end the ballad "Bad Funk Stripe."

In Australia a limited edition was issued with a bonus CD featuring the single version of "Just Ace", five live songs—illustrating the band's sense of humour and ability to play live—and a hidden track, the acoustic "Protest". The live tracks were recorded at Grudgefest in Sydney on Saturday 27 September 1997. The United States branch of Universal Records signed the band by late 1998 and released an altered version of Guide to Better Living on 9 March 1999. The cover was also modified with the band's name and album title written in a different style. The album sold over 12,000 copies in the US on the back of extensive touring by the band in North America with bands such as Creed, Lit, Godsmack and Anthrax. The group's second album, Easy followed in November 1999.

Reception

According to the Worldwide Home of Australasian Music and More Online (WHAMMO), "[a]fter being discovered by Triple J and then signed by Grudge records, this was the album that hammered it home - Grinspoon were destined to be the most rock and roll party down aviator-shades-wearing Oz rock band of the late '90s".

Track listing

Personnel
Grinspoon members
 Phil Jamieson – vocals, guitar
 Pat Davern – guitar
 Joe Hansen – bass guitar 
 Kristian Hopes – drums

Additional musicians
 Ted Reiger – keyboards

Production details
 Producer – Phillip McKellar, Grinspoon, Ulrich Wild
 Engineer – Phillip McKellar, Ulrich Wild
Assistant engineer – Greg Courtney, Flip Osman, Chris Riband
 Mastering – Ron Baker, Tom Baker
 Mixing – Phillip McKellar, Ulrich Wild
 Mixing assistant – Flip Osman, Chris Riband
 Studio – Rocking Horse Studios

Art works
 Photography – Paul Blackmore, Sophie Howarth, Stephen Stickler

Charts

Weekly charts

Year-end charts

Certifications

Releases

References 

1997 debut albums
Grinspoon albums